Snøholstinden is a mountain in Vang Municipality in Innlandet county, Norway. The mountain is located in the Jotunheimen mountains and inside the Jotunheimen National Park. The mountain is surrounded by several other notable mountains including Storegut to the southwest, Store Rauddalseggje to the northeast, Slettmarkpiggen and Galdeberget to the southeast, and Høgbrothøgdi and Langeskavlen to the southwest.

See also
List of mountains of Norway by height

References

Vang, Innlandet
Mountains of Innlandet